Satriano is a town and comune in the province of Catanzaro in the Calabria region of southern Italy.

Geography
The town is bordered by Cardinale, Davoli, Gagliato, Petrizzi, San Sostene and Soverato.

Notes and references

Cities and towns in Calabria